The 2010–11 Ukrainian Cup  is the 20th annual season of Ukraine's football knockout competition, and third under the name of DATAGROUP – Football Ukraine Cup.

The Cup begins with two preliminary rounds, before the first round proper involving the Premier League clubs. The draw for both the preliminary rounds was held on July 14, 2010. The First Preliminary Round consists of teams from Druha Liha and Amateur Cup champions and has only five fixtures. In the Second Preliminary Round teams of the Persha Liha enter the competition. Sixteen teams, winners of the 2nd preliminary round enter the First Round or the Round of 32 where the Premier League teams enter the competition for the first time.

Tavriya Simferopol is the defending champion and as a member of the Premier League enter the competition at the Round of 32. Tavriya were eliminated in the Round of 32 by Dnipro Dnipropetrovsk 1–4. This season's winner enters the play-off round of the UEFA Europa League 2011–12.

Format 
This season's format for the main event has changed again. The announcement of the format was given during the draw of the round 32 in the headquarters of the FFU. All matches consist of a single game and would include extra time and series of penalties if necessary to identify a winner. The broadcast of the draw was officially conducted for the first time by one of the sponsors of the Ukrainian Premier League (Footballua).

The draw was blind. All participants were ranked according to their table standings on September 8, 2010 and listed in that order for the draw. All seeds of pairs were numerated such as the first pair consisted of number 1 and number 2, the second pair of number 3 and number 4, the third – 5 and 6, and so on. Clubs of a lower league when seeded with one from a higher would receive a home advantage. However, in case for the same league seeded clubs, the hosting club was identified by an odd number that was drawn upon calling its name. A former Soviet player Vadym Yevtushenko was invited as a "special guest" to conduct the draw. For each announced club from the ranking list a ball with a number was drawn from a pot. According to the number, the announced club was placed into the seed with the corresponding number. The first club that was announced was FC Shakhtar Donetsk.

For the Round of 16 draw was invited Viktor Leonenko as the honorary visitor.

Fifty eight teams entered the Ukrainian Cup competition.

Distribution

Round and draw dates 
All draws held at FFU headquarters (Building of Football) in Kyiv unless stated otherwise.

Competition schedule

First Preliminary Round 
In this round entered 8 clubs from the Druha Liha, the winner of the Ukrainian Amateur Cup, and the newly admitted club from Nova Kakhovka all seeded into five fixtures. The round matches are scheduled to be played July 28, 2010.

Notes:
 Match not played due to Ros Bila Tserkva's financial difficulties

 Qualify as Amateur Cup Champions of Ukraine 2009.

 The match was played on July 27, 2010

Second Preliminary Round 
In this round entered all 17 clubs from Persha Liha (except Dynamo-2 Kyiv) and the higher seeded 10 clubs from the Druha Liha. They were drawn against the 5 winners of the First Preliminary Round. The round matches are scheduled were played August 18, 2010, unless otherwise noted.

Bracket 

The pairings for each round were not known from the incept.

Round of 32 
In this round entered all 16 teams from the Premier League. They were drawn against the 16 winners from the previous round consisting of nine clubs from the First League, six clubs from the Second League, and one representative from the amateur league.
The draw took place September 8, 2010.

Notes:

Round of 16 
In this round entered winners from the previous round. The Premier League is represented with 10 clubs, the First League – 4, and the Second League – 2. The draw for the round took place on October 1, 2010.

Notes:
 Initially the management of Feniks-Illichivets Kalinine informed their opponents that the club has removed itself from further competitions. However, four days later the club informed the PFL that their financial state had stabilized and that they would play.

Quarter-finals 
In this round entered winners from the previous round. The Premier League is represented with 7 clubs and the First League with 1 club. The draw for the round took place on October 28, 2010.

Semi-finals 
In this round entered winners from the previous round. The draw for the round took place on November 25, 2010.

Final

Top goalscorers

See also 
 2010-11 Ukrainian Premier League
 2010-11 Ukrainian First League
 2010–11 Ukrainian Second League
 UEFA Europa League 2010-11

References

External links 
 PFL official website 
 UPL official website 

Ukrainian Cup seasons
Cup
Ukrainian Cup